The Cambodia Davis Cup team represents Cambodia in Davis Cup tennis competition and are governed by the Tennis Federation of Cambodia.

Cambodia currently compete in the Asia/Oceania Zone of Group IV.

History
Cambodia competed in its first Davis Cup in 2012.

Current team (2022) 

TBD

See also
Davis Cup

References

External links

Davis Cup teams
Davis Cup
Davis Cup